Hans Gunnar Fredrik Hallström (5 January 1910 – 29 June 1989) was a Swedish trade unionist and politician.

Hallström joined the Swedish Social Democratic Youth League in 1927, remaining active in it until 1936.  He then became leader of the Malmö branch of the Swedish Municipal Workers' Union (Kommunal), and was elected to the city council.  In 1948, he was elected as president of Kommunal, serving until 1973, also serving on the committee of the Swedish Trade Union Confederation.  In 1964, he was also elected as president of the Public Services International.  He retired in 1973.

References

1910 births
1989 deaths
Politicians from Malmö
Swedish Social Democratic Party politicians
Swedish trade unionists